Big Sur Unified School District is a public school district in the southern Big Sur region of Monterey County, California, United States. It was originally the Pacific Valley School in the 1920s and served residents on the south coast including Manchester, Plaskett, Lucia, and Gorda,

The Pacific Valley School District was formally established in the 1950s and was renamed Big Sur Unified School District in 2012. It consists of the public Pacific Valley School in southern Big Sur, which serves 
grades K–12 in several small hamlets and communities. It is also the authorizing agency for the Big Sur Charter School located in Monterey. The district does not include the Cooper School in Big Sur Village which is administered as part of the Carmel Unified School District.

Pacific Valley School 

Pacific Valley School has a 3:1 student/teacher ratio. The small student population of 20-24 students, taught by three faculty, spans preschool through twelfth grade. They engage in collaborative learning between age groups. All of the administrative staff also serve as teachers or teachers aides. The school is located at 69325 Highway 1 in southern Big Sur. 73% of its students receive a free or reduced price lunch.

Big Sur Charter School 

The Big Sur Charter School is located in Monterey, California,  to the north of the Pacific Valley School. It describes itself as a "non-classroom based school, " They provide education for children too "learn at home, in their communities, and in nature." Their total enrollment is 101 students in grades K-12. The school has a student/teacher ratio of 26:1, higher than the California state level of 23:1.

References

External links
 

School districts in Monterey County, California
Big Sur
1950s establishments in California